Tribes of Redwall Otters was published in 2002 as an accessory to the Redwall series by Brian Jacques.

Summary
This booklet about otters features trivia questions, a giant poster, profiles of many of the otter characters that are featured in the series, and the much anticipated recipe for Shrimp and Hotroot Soup.  The book offers insight into the culture and history of otters, listing important otter characters and customs from the series.

It was illustrated by Jonathan Walker.

References 

Redwall books
2002 children's books
2002 fantasy novels